Samir Zaoui (born 3 June 1976 in) is an Algerian former player and the current manager of ASO Chlef.

International career
Zaoui made his international debut on March 29, 2003 in a friendly against Angola. He was a member of the Algerian 2004 African Nations Cup team which reached quarter-finals.

National team statistics

Honours
 Won the Algerian Cup once with ASO Chlef in 2005
 Won the Algerian Ligue Professionnelle 1 once with ASO Chlef in 2011

References

External links
 

1976 births
Living people
People from Médéa Province
Algerian footballers
Algeria international footballers
2004 African Cup of Nations players
2010 Africa Cup of Nations players
Olympique de Médéa players
ASO Chlef players
Algerian Ligue Professionnelle 1 players
Association football defenders
Algerian football managers
ASO Chlef managers
Algerian Ligue Professionnelle 1 managers
21st-century Algerian people